Vasily Vasilyevich Stroganov, also known as Stroganoff, (Vyazma, – 24 September 1938) was a Russian physician specializing in obstetrics and gynaecology. His works mostly dealt with treatment of eclampsia. The Stroganoff method is named after him.

References
Thomas F. Baskett. "On the Shoulders of Giants: Eponyms and Names in Obstetrics and Gynaecology", second edition, RCOG Press, Royal College of Obstetricians and Gynaecologists, 2008.

External links
 
 Biography by Torsten Sørensen

1858 births
1938 deaths
People from Vyazma
People from Vyazemsky Uyezd
Russian obstetricians
Russian gynaecologists
Soviet obstetricians and gynaecologists